Viskyar Ridge (’rid vis-’kyar) is a rocky ridge rising to 600 m and extending 2.5 km in north-south direction in Breznik Heights, Greenwich Island in the South Shetland Islands, Antarctica. Surmounting Zheravna Glacier to the west and Targovishte Glacier to the east, with its south extremity forming Sartorius Point.

The feature is named after Viskyar Mountain in western Bulgaria.

Location 
The ridge's summit at its north extremity of the ridge is located 1.49 km southeast of Momchil Peak, 1.65 km southwest of Lyutitsa Nunatak, 1.14 km west of Vratsa Peak, 1.79 km west-northwest of Ziezi Peak, 2.05 km north of Sartorius Point, and 2.7 km east of Razgrad Peak (Bulgarian survey Tangra 2004/05 and mapping in 2009).

Map
 L.L. Ivanov et al. Antarctica: Livingston Island and Greenwich Island, South Shetland Islands. Scale 1:100000 topographic map. Sofia: Antarctic Place-names Commission of Bulgaria, 2005.

Notes

References
 Viskyar Ridge. SCAR Composite Antarctic Gazetteer
 Bulgarian Antarctic Gazetteer. Antarctic Place-names Commission. (details in Bulgarian, basic data in English)

External links
 Viskyar Ridge. Copernix satellite image

Ridges of Greenwich Island